Jose Estella (1870 - 6 April 1943) was a Filipino composer and conductor who was known for his title as the "Philippine Waltz King". Besides composing waltzes, he also became one of the major contributors of localizing Spanish zarzuelas from 1890s to 1900s.

Biography 
Born in 1870, Jose Estella studied at the Madrid Conservatory and after graduating, returned back to the Philippines to pursue a career in music. In Manila and Cebu, he conducted several orchestras and was director of the Rizal Orchestra, founded in 1898. Estella also became involved with a plagiarism case in 1939 with Francisco Santiago over which Estella complains that Santiago copied his Campanadas de Gloria but in the end of the investigation, it was revealed that they both get inspiration from the same folk song named "Leron Leron Sinta". He died on April 6, 1941 and throughout his lifetime, he composed more than 100 waltzes hence he is given the title, "the Philippine Waltz King". There are no information regarding his personal life except he has a son named Ramon Estella, a film director.

Notable Works 
Ang Maya

Composed in 1905, it was a piece from Estella's zarzuela, "Filipinas para los Filipinos" with Severino Reyes as librettist. The piece represented the everyday life of the common people in the Philippines, thus predating some works by other composers who graduated from UP Conservatory of Music in the 1920s. Severino’s youngest son, Pedrito, said that the song was inspired by the maya chirping in the trees near his father’s summer hut.

La Tagala

Originally composed for piano in 1890s and 1900s, Estella's "La Tagala" was one of his well-known works throughout his lifetime. The waltz is a collection of Filipino folk songs such as Balitaw, Hele hele, Kundiman, Kumintang, etc. It was dedicated to the Tobacco Company Germinal.

Filipinas Symphony (1928)

Jose Estella's Filipinas Symphony is the first Filipino Symphony by modern scholarly consensus. Although not much was known about the information about the piece, according to sources, the symphony was based on the Filipino folk song "Balitaw" meanwhile the Slow Movement (Adagio) was based on another folk song "Kumintang".

Other Works 
 California March (Ragtime)
 El Diablo Mundo - First performed at the inauguration of the Teatro Zorrila on October 25, 1893, this zarzuela was described to have a dark and gloomy atmosphere.
 Los Pajaros
 Katubusan (Fox-Trot)
 My Dreamed Waltz

References 

1870 births
1943 deaths
Filipino composers
Filipino conductors (music)